The Tiwi Islands Football League is an Australian rules football competition in the Tiwi Islands, Northern Territory, Australia.
Australian Rules football is the most popular sport on the Tiwi Islands.
The Grand Final of the TIFL was broadcast on ABC Northern Territory until 2012.

Tiwi football

The Tiwi Islands Grand Final is an event held in March each year that attracts up to 3,000 spectators and is a tourist attraction for the Northern Territory.  The Tiwi Australian Football League has 900 participants out of a community of about 2600, the highest football participation rate in Australia (35%).  Tiwi footballers are renowned for exquisite one touch skills.  Many of the players have a preference for participating barefoot.  Many of the male players also play for the St Mary's Football Club in Darwin's Northern Territory Football League.

Notable players
Many players playing for the Tiwi Islands Football League have also played for St Mary's Football club, as well as the AFL. Some of these players include the Rioli family.

Clubs
Imalu Football Club (Tigers)
Walama Football Club (Bulldogs - formerly Irrimaru Football Club)
Pumarali Football Club (Thunder & Lightning)
Tapalinga Football Club (Superstars)
Muluwurri Magpies (Magpie Geese - formerly Taracumbi Football Club)
Tuyu Football Club (Buffaloes)
Ranku Football Club (Eagles)
Melville Island Roos Football Club (Kangaroos)

Former clubs
Warankuwu Football Club
Nguiu Football Club

History
Br. John Pye and Br. Andy Howley introduced Australian rules football to Bathurst and Melville islands in 1941.

The locals quickly took to the game and the first dedicated ground was built in 1942.

In 1944, the first games consisting of a full complement of 18 players and matches according to the rule book were played.

By the end of the decade, football was the Tiwi's No.1 sport.

In 1954, the St Mary's Football Club began enlisting Tiwi servicemen, and in the following year with the assistance of a majority of Tiwi players won the NTFL premiership.

Within a couple of decades, the major Australian leagues began to take an interest with the first player offered a contract being Joe Saturninas in 1955.

In the 1960s, the most talented export of the TIFL, ruckman David Kantilla had a successful career first in the NTFL, and then reached its peak when he later became a leading player in the South Australian National Football League (SANFL) with South Adelaide Football Club, where he was a member of the 1964 premiership team, and won the best and fairest and leading goal kicking awards at the club.  The Tiwi Island league's top goalkicking award was later named after him.

The 1969/1970 Wet Season saw the first season of the TIFL, with 5 teams competing: Pumarali, Tapalinga, Imalu, Tuyu and Irrimaru.

From 1980–1981, Tiwi Islander Maurice Rioli won two Simpson Medals for Western Australian Football League (WAFL) club South Fremantle as best player in WAFL Grand Finals before his recruitment by Victorian Football League (VFL) in 1982, where he won the Norm Smith Medal for the best player in the 1982 VFL Grand Final. Michael Long would later also win a Norm Smith Medal, in 1993. Other Tiwi Islanders in the AFL include Adam Kerinaiua, who played three games for the Brisbane Bears in 1992 and Malcolm Lynch, who played two games for the Western Bulldogs. Although these players were not from the TIFL, the success of these players in the elite Australian competition did much to boost the popularity of Australian Rules amongst the local Tiwi Islanders.

In 2006, it was announced that a Tiwi Bombers Football Club would join the Northern Territory Football League initially known as the "Super Tiwis".  The team began 2006 season as the "Tiwi Bombers".

See also
AFL Northern Territory
Northern Territory Football League
Australian rules football in the Northern Territory

References

External links
 

Australian rules football competitions in the Northern Territory
Tiwi Islands